Ogg's formula is either of two things named after Andrew Ogg:
 Ogg's formula for the conductor of an elliptic curve
 The Grothendieck–Ogg–Shafarevich formula for the Euler characteristic of a curve